Jhochhen Tole, popularly known as Old Freak Street, or Freak Street is a small neighbourhood located at the south of Kathmandu Durbar Square.

Presently known as Old Freak Street, this ancient street was named Freak Street, referring to the hippie trail of the 1960s and 1970s.

History
Freak Street was the epicenter during the Hippie trail from the early 1960s to late 1970s. During that time the main attraction drawing tourists to Freak Street was the government-run hashish shops. Hippies from different parts of the world traveled to Freak Street (Basantapur) in search of legal cannabis. Direct bus services to Freak Street were also available from the airport and borders targeting the hippies looking for legal smokes. Freak Street was a hippie nirvana, since marijuana and hashish were legal and sold openly in government licensed shops. A young restless population in the west, seeking to distance itself from political and social frustration, had firsthand contact with the culture, art and architecture, and lifestyle that attracted them to Freak Street.

In the early 1970s, the government of Nepal started a round-up of hippies on Freak Street and deported them to India, an action propelled largely by a directive from the government of United States of America. The government imposed a strict regulation for tourists regarding dress codes and physical appearances. After imposing such regulations by government the hippies felt vulnerable and the hippie movement of Nepal died out in the late 1970s. It was under this directive that the Nepali government came to ban the production and sale of hashish and marijuana in Nepal. The hippie tourism was quickly replaced with the more conventional businesses of trekking and cultural tourism.

Culture
Old Freak Street's history and prime position in the heart of Kathmandu still makes it a popular destination among the locals. Once labeled as being a place to find enlightenment, a lot of things have transformed since the deportation of the hippies in the early 1970s. This ancient street which was named as Freak Street, after the hippies, presently the name Freak Street has been converted into Old Freak Street since the place is not anymore like it used to be back in the 1960s. This place is now just a mythical magnet for hippies and other social variants of the 1960s. Guest houses, trekking agencies, shopping centres, souvenir shops, restaurants are the businesses the local entrepreneurs have adapted after banning of the cannabis in Nepal. Overshadowed by the glamour of Thamel, a primary tourist area in Kathmandu, Old Freak Street has not been able to revive its charm among the tourists since then.

See also
 Kathmandu Durbar Square
 Kathmandu
Chicken Street

References

Streets in Kathmandu
Hippie movement
Recreational drug tourism